The Roman Catholic Diocese of Miao is a diocese in the Ecclesiastical province of Guwahati. It is located in Miao in India.

It was created on 7 December 2005, by splitting it from the Diocese of Dibrugarh. Its first bishop is George Palliparampil. The Christ the Light Shrine in Miao is the cathedral of the diocese. The cathedral was built and blessed in 2011.

The diocese covers 8 districts of the state of Arunachal Pradesh - Tirap, Changlang, Lohit, Longding, Anjaw, Namsai, Dibang Valley and Lower Dibang Valley Districts. Neighboring dioceses are Itanagar and Dibrugarh to the west. To the north and northeast is China, to the south and southeast Myanmar.

The diocese covers an area of 31,445 km2. As of 2005, 59,030 of the 420,000 people in the area are members of the Catholic Church. The diocese is subdivided into 31  parishes.

Saints and causes for canonisation
 Servants of God Fr. Nicolas-Michel Krick, MEP and Fr. Augustin-Etienne Bourry, MEP

References

External links
Miao Diocese official website
GCatholic.org
Catholic-hierarchy.org
Vatican press release on the creation 

Roman Catholic dioceses in India
Christianity in Arunachal Pradesh
Christian organizations established in 2005
Roman Catholic dioceses and prelatures established in the 21st century
2005 establishments in Arunachal Pradesh